Morris-Hair Tavern, also known as Heinbaugh's Hand-Picked Produce & Special Gifts, is a historic home that also served as an inn and tavern located at South Union Township, Fayette County, Pennsylvania.  It was built in 1818, and is a -story, 5-bay, sandstone building with a center hall floor plan in an Early Republic style. It has a -story, kitchen ell. It served as a stop for 19th-century travelers on the National Road.

It was added to the National Register of Historic Places in 1995.

References

Houses on the National Register of Historic Places in Pennsylvania
Houses completed in 1818
Houses in Fayette County, Pennsylvania
National Register of Historic Places in Fayette County, Pennsylvania